Maxwell is an unincorporated community in Caldwell County, Texas, United States. According to the Handbook of Texas, it had a population of 500 in 2000. It is located within the Greater Austin metropolitan area.

History
In 1887, the Katy built through the community, and the original name, New Martindale, was changed to Maxwell in honor of Thomas Maxwell, who obtained a grant in 1845 for the league of land on which the community stands. Maxwell's earliest settlers came primarily from Alabama and other states, but in the 1880s German groups arrived; their influence is still visible in the community. Mexican farmworkers added a second large component to the local population. Social life in early Maxwell centered on the dancing, singing, and shooting clubs traditional to German communities. The Maxwell Social Club was organized in 1953 to supervise athletic and recreational activities and to assist in welfare, relief, and other civic projects. The Maxwell post office was established in 1888. The population increased from twenty-five to 100 between 1890 and 1892 and the town acquired two general stores, a gristmill, and a gin. Fire almost destroyed Maxwell on three occasions-in 1887, in 1910, after which the town rebuilt its commercial area in brick, and in 1922. Maxwell had a population of 225, two churches, two general stores, two cotton gins, and a bank in 1914, and later three cotton gins, a restaurant, a physician, a drugstore, and numerous retail establishments. In 1929, the town had a population of 400 and eighteen businesses. It subsequently declined. In 1980, the community was the location for the filming of a movie, Raggedy Man, in which locals appeared in small roles. The Katy Railroad, purchased by the Union Pacific, opened new routes to San Marcos in 1989. In 1990, Maxwell had the post office, nine small businesses, and a population of 185. The population grew to 500 by 2000. The community's largest employer, the Nagle Manufacturing and Supply Company manufactured coathangers.

Although it is unincorporated, Maxwell has a post office, with the ZIP Code of 78656.

The Gospel Broadcasting Network films a syndicated network called World Video Bible School in the community. The National Hispanic Institute is headquartered in the community.

On June 20, 2022, two brothers of the Maxwell Volunteer Fire Department were killed when their truck crashed into another vehicle while they were fighting a wildfire.

2016 Lockhart hot air balloon crash
On July 30, 2016, the town gained attention due to the 2016 Lockhart hot air balloon crash. The hot air balloon struck a power line near Maxwell and caught on fire, killing all 16 occupants aboard. The accident at Maxwell is currently the deadliest in the United States and the second deadliest in the world.

Geography
Maxwell stands on the Missouri, Kansas and Texas railroad along the junction of Texas State Highway 142 and Farm to Market Road 1966, about 8 miles west of Lockhart in northwestern Caldwell County.

Education
There was a Methodist church in the community that was built in 1882 by Rev. Ulrich Steiner that was also used as a school. A Lutheran church was built to provide classes for teaching German and English in the community from 1886 to the early 1940s, as well as church services. A social club also provided educational assistance for the community. The community's earliest school was located three miles outside of Maxwell and a school district called the Maxwell Common School District was formed. The campus was constructed with private subscriptions. It then became an independent school district in 1907 and the building only served African American students. Three separate schools served a combined total of 438 students. These students were White, Black, and Mexican. Today the community is served by the Lockhart Independent School District.

References

Unincorporated communities in Texas
Unincorporated communities in Caldwell County, Texas
Greater Austin